Shelter Bay may refer to:

Shelter Bay, British Columbia, a ferry terminal on Upper Arrow Lake, British Columbia
Shelter Bay, Quebec
Shelter Bay, Washington, a small community near La Conner, Washington
 Shelter Bay (ship, 1922) -- a freighter operated by the Quebec & Ontario Transportation Company